Margarit Atanasov (born 20 February 1958) is a Bulgarian boxer. He competed in the men's light welterweight event at the 1980 Summer Olympics. At the 1980 Summer Olympics, he lost to Ace Rusevski of Yugoslavia.

References

External links
 

1958 births
Living people
Bulgarian male boxers
Olympic boxers of Bulgaria
Boxers at the 1980 Summer Olympics
Place of birth missing (living people)
Light-welterweight boxers